"Beg Your Pardon" is a song written by Francis Craig and Beasley Smith and published in 1947 by the Robbins Music Corporation. It was recorded in 1947 by Frankie Carle and His Orchestra for Columbia Records. Another recording of the song was made that year by Francis Craig, the song's author, and the track maintained the #3 position on the U.S. Billboard charts for twenty weeks in 1948 and the #4 position for a further sixteen weeks of that year.

Recordings
Frankie Carle and His Orchestra (Columbia 38036)
Francis Craig (Bullet 1012)
The Dinning Sisters (Capitol 490)
Larry Green and His Orchestra (Victor 20-2647)
Art Mooney (MGM 10140)
Snooky Lanson (Mercury 5109)
Eddy Howard (Majestic 1320)
Russ Morgan (Decca 24339)
Pat Boone on the album Howdy! (1956)

See also
1948 in music

Notes 

1947 songs
Songs written by Francis Craig
Songs written by Beasley Smith